The Niederrheiner is a German breed of chicken. It is named for the Niederrhein or Lower Rhine region where it originated in the early twentieth century, and derives principally from the Dutch North Holland Blue meat chicken. It was recognized in Germany in 1943. In the twenty-first century it is an endangered breed. 

A bantam version, the Zwerg-Niederrheiner, was developed from the standard-sized breed.

History 

The Niederrheiner was bred in the Niederrhein or Lower Rhine region of western Germany in the years before the Second World War. Birds of the North Holland Blue meat chicken, developed in Holland at the start of the century, had been brought to the area in the late 1920s, but had attracted little interest. Two breeders, Friedrich Regenstein and J. Jobs, crossed them with various other breeds, both heavy and light, to create the Niederrheiner. It received official recognition in 1943.

A breed census in 1997 found 1482 birds in the hands of 138 breeders. In 2001 the Niederrheiner was listed in category III,   ("endangered") on the Rote Liste of the Gesellschaft zur Erhaltung alter und gefährdeter Haustierrassen. In 2007 its conservation status was listed by the FAO as "not at risk"; in 2022 it was reported to DAD-IS as "at risk". In 2021 the breeding population was reported to be 1660, consisting of 308 cock birds and 1352 hens.

A bantam version, the Zwerg-Niederrheiner, was developed from the standard-sized breed. It was later used in the development of a bantam North Holland Blue.

Characteristics 

The Niederrheiner is closely similar to the North Holland Blue from which it derives, the principal difference being the absence of feathering on the legs.

Five plumage varieties are recognised by the Entente Européenne d’Aviculture et de Cuniculture:  crele, silver, lemon cuckoo, blue cuckoo and birchen. The bantam is recognised in eight varieties.

The birds are docile and have little tendency to fly; hens are not good sitters.

Use 

The Niederrheiner was bred as a meat chicken. It is fast-growing, and has fine white flesh and white skin.

Further reading 
* Walter Schwarz and Armin Six (2004). Der große Geflügelstandard in Farbe. Band 1: Hühner, Truthühner, Perlhühner (seventh edition, in German). Reutlingen: Oertel + Spörer. 

Chicken breeds
Chicken breeds originating in Germany